Bezni may refer to:
 Bezni Bodaq
 Bezni-ye Cheragh Mardan